The  is a 421-ton vessel owned and operated by the Sea Shepherd Conservation Society since September 2018.

The vessel was retrofitted in Fernandina Beach, Florida, to be used in direct action Sea Shepherd Conservation Society operations against illegal fisheries activities. Its first operation is at the Guadalupe Island on the southern Sea of Cortez, Mexico. Its first operation is called Operation Divina Guadalupe VI and study the Cuvier's beaked whale.

History
The ship was built in 1944 for the US Navy and served in World War II in Pearl Harbor delivering ammunition to naval vessels. She was acquired by the US Coast Guard in 1946 serving on the Alaskan coastline until the 1970s. The vessel was later relocated to Mississippi as a buoy tender until her retirement from the Coast Guard in 1998. The vessel was purchased by Benoit Vulliet for oceanographic research, and years later, he donated it to Sea Shepherd Conservation Society.

In late 2021 because of age Sea Shepherd had the vessel decommissioned and scrapped in Mexico. Sea Shepherd plans to acquire a new vessel in 2022 to replace it on its Central America patrols.

See also
 Neptune's Navy, Sea Shepherd vessels
 Sea Shepherd Conservation Society operations

References

External links

Historic American Engineering Record in Louisiana
Sea Shepherd Conservation Society ships
Ships transferred from the United States Navy to the United States Coast Guard
White-class coastal buoy tenders
1944 ships
Ships built in Napa, California